Hennessy may refer to:

People
 Hennessy (surname), includes list of people with the name
 Hennessy Carolina, a cast member of Love & Hip Hop: New York

Business and trade 
 Hennessy, a brand of cognac
 Hennessy's, a defunct Montana-based department store
 Hennessy & Hennessy, a former architectural partnership in Australia
 Hennessey Performance Engineering, an American automotive tuning house

Places
 Hennessy Road, a main thoroughfare in Hong Kong
 Hennessy (constituency), a constituency in Wan Chai District

Sport 
 Hennessy Gold Cup
 Hennessy Gold Cup (Ireland)

Other uses 
 Hennessy (film), a 1975 film about the Irish Republican Army
 Hennessy–Milner logic, in computer science
 Hours of Hennessy, aka The book of hours of Our Lady, a 1530 manuscript illustrated by Simon Bening of Bruges

See also
 Hennessey (disambiguation)